Crazy like a Fox is a 1926 American short film starring Charley Chase. The two-reel silent comedy stars Chase as a young man who feigns insanity in order to get out of an arranged marriage, only to find out that his sweetheart is the girl he has been arranged to marry.  Chase would remake the film as The Wrong Miss Wright (1937) in the sound era during his tenure at Columbia Pictures.

The film features Oliver Hardy in a small role filmed shortly before his teaming with Stan Laurel.

Crazy Like a Fox was preserved by the Academy Film Archive in 2006.

Cast
 Charley Chase as Wilson, the Groom
 William V. Mong as George, the Bride's Father
 Martha Sleeper as The Bride
 Milla Davenport as Mother
 William Blaisdell as Gov. Harrison
 Max Asher as Butler
 Al Hallett as Mr. Gloom, the valet
 Tyler Brooke (uncredited)
 Helen Gilmore (uncredited)
 Oliver Hardy as Charley's Victim (uncredited)
 Jerry Mandy as Hospital orderly (uncredited)
 Lyle Tayo as Nurse (uncredited)

References

External links

1926 films
1926 comedy films
1926 short films
American silent short films
American black-and-white films
Films directed by Leo McCarey
Silent American comedy films
Films with screenplays by H. M. Walker
American comedy short films
1920s American films